Guru Gobind Singh Super Thermal Power Plant is located at Ghanauli near Ropar in Punjab. The power plant is one of the coal based power plants of PSPCL.

Power plant
Guru Gobind Singh Super Thermal Power Station is situated near village Ghanauli on Ropar-Kiratpur Sahib National highway NH-21. It is about 12 km from Ropar and 55 km from Chandigarh. The plant has an installed capacity of 1260 MW. The first unit was commissioned in September, 1984.
During March 1985, the second unit was commissioned and in later years four more units were added.

The station received the Incentive award for reducing fuel oil consumption in 1999.

The station also received the Shield and excellent performance by Prime minister of India during 1986-87 for achieving 70.08% PLF against then 53.2%. The plant has its source of water supply from Nangal Hydel Channel. The coal used mainly comes from mines in Bihar, West Bengal and Madhya Pradesh from more than 50 sources called collieries

Installed capacity
It has an installed capacity of 1260 MW. But now total output left is 840 MW. The proposal to shut down the thermal power plant has been under consideration of the Government of Punjab. Another proposal is to build five supercritical thermal power plants of 800 MW each, which will replace the existing power units.

References

Coal-fired power stations in Punjab, India
Rupnagar district
Memorials to Guru Gobind Singh
Energy infrastructure completed in 1984
1984 establishments in Punjab, India
20th-century architecture in India